Huis ter Heide can refer to:

Huis ter Heide, Utrecht
Huis ter Heide (Scharsterland)
Huis ter Heide (Tietjerksteradeel)
Huis ter Heide, Drenthe